Anne Tanqueray née Willaume (1691–1733) was an English silversmith, active from 1724–1733.

Early life 
Anne Tanqueray was born in 1691 to David Willaume I, a prominent Huguenot silversmith, who had come to London from France in 1685.

Career 
Tanqueray's husband established a workshop, and it is likely that Tanqueray created items bearing her husband's mark. Upon her husband's death, after 1724, she took over his business and she entered two marks (Sterling and New Standard) in the register at Goldsmiths' Hall. Her marks appeared alongside her husband's original 1713 mark, with his name being struck through and hers written above, as opposed to a new entry, which was custom for a widow. This appears to be the only instance in which this happened.

As a female silversmith in the 18th century, Tanqueray would have had the opportunity to produce her own work and oversee skilled journeymen. Tanqueray's workshop was noted for its high level of excellence and in 1729 it became Subordinate Goldsmith to the King.

Personal life 
In 1717, she married David Tanqueray, her father's apprentice; they had two sons.

Death 
Tanqueray died in 1733 and was buried in Tingrith on 25 July that year.

Legacy 
Examples of Tanqueray's work can be found at Temple Newsam, Huguenot Museum in Rochester, Kent, Victoria and Albert Museum, the National Museum Wales, Welbeck Abbey, and the Clark Art Institute collections.

References

External links 
 Examples of Tanqueray's work on Bonhams website
 Example of work in the National Museum of Wales
 Example of work at the Clark Art Institute
 Four salt-cellars by Anne Tanqueray available to view at Welbeck Abbey

1691 births
1733 deaths
English silversmiths
Women silversmiths
18th-century English businesspeople
English women artists
18th-century English businesswomen